Alexander Travis Howard Jr. (July 9, 1924 – February 10, 2011) was a United States district judge of the United States District Court for the Southern District of Alabama.

Education and career

Born in Mobile, Alabama, Howard was in the United States Army during World War II, from 1943 to 1946, and then received a Bachelor of Laws from Vanderbilt University Law School in 1950. He was a United States Probation Officer from 1950 to 1951, and was in private practice in Mobile from 1951 to 1986. He was a Commissioner for the United States District Court for the Southern District of Alabama from 1956 to 1970.

Federal judicial service

On September 23, 1986, Howard was nominated by President Ronald Reagan to a new seat on the United States District Court for the Southern District of Alabama created by 98 Stat. 333. He was confirmed by the United States Senate on October 8, 1986 and received his commission on October 14, 1986. He served as Chief Judge from 1989 to 1994, assuming senior status on October 21, 1996. Howard died in Mobile and was buried at Pine Crest Cemetery.

Notable case

He presided over the Southern Poverty Law Center vs United Klans of America civil trial when an all-white jury ordered the Klan to pay $7 million to the family of a young black man who was lynched in Mobile in 1981.

References

External links
 

1924 births
2011 deaths
Judges of the United States District Court for the Southern District of Alabama
United States district court judges appointed by Ronald Reagan
20th-century American judges
United States Army personnel of World War II
Vanderbilt University Law School alumni